Cornelius Britt (10 August 1947 – 23 July 2022) was an Australian rules footballer who played with Collingwood in the Victorian Football League (VFL).

Britt, who was recruited from Golden Point in the Ballarat Football League, was a utility who was regarded as being hard at the ball. He appeared in seven finals matches, including the 1970 VFL Grand Final loss to Carlton where he played as a half forward flanker and kicked a goal. He was also used as a centreman and ruck-rover during his career. He retired at the age of 26 in 1973.

References

External links 

 
 
 Con Britt at Collingwood Forever

1947 births
2022 deaths
Australian rules footballers from Victoria (Australia)
Collingwood Football Club players
Golden Point Football Club players